The Sligo county football team represents Sligo in men's Gaelic football and is governed by Sligo GAA, the county board of the Gaelic Athletic Association. The team competes in the three major annual inter-county competitions; the All-Ireland Senior Football Championship, the Connacht Senior Football Championship and the National Football League.

Sligo's home ground is Markievicz Park, Sligo. The team's manager is Tony McEntee.

The team last won the Connacht Senior Championship in 2007, but has never won the All-Ireland Senior Championship or the National League.

According to Martin Breheny, Sligo routinely has a ranking within the bottom sixteen of county football teams.

Crest and colours
Sligo's team colours are black and white. Sligo's jerseys have alternated between black and white over the years. In the 1990s, Sligo opted for predominantly white shirts with black shorts, with exceptions in 1995 and 1996 when they wore an all-black strip.  and after a win over Kildare decided to make the all-black kit its first choice.

Sligo's crest features Benbulbin in the background, one of the iconic landmarks of County Sligo.

Team sponsorship
Clifford Electrical is a former shirt sponsor.

Abbvie has been Sligo's shirt sponsor since the 2016 season, succeeding Radisson.

History
Due to its much smaller population than both County Galway and County Mayo, the two dominant forces in the province of Connacht, and competition from professional League of Ireland soccer team Sligo Rovers in the county's capital town. The county football team has never been able release itself from the shackles inherent in the provincial championship format. It has won the Connacht Senior Football Championship (SFC) on only three occasions, with about 50 years between each win. These championships came in 1928, 1975 and 2007.

Sligo has never appeared in an All-Ireland Senior Football Championship (SFC) final. The 1922 championship is the closest it has come, defeating Roscommon, Mayo and Galway to win the Connacht title, and beating Tipperary in the subsequent All-Ireland semi-final that followed. However an objection from Galway on what is described as "a flimsy technicality" led to the Connacht decider being brought to a replay, which Sligo lost. Sligo met the same fate in the inaugural National Football League campaign of 1926, beating Laois to reach the final, only for Laois to object on the grounds of a Sligo player's name being misspelled; Sligo lost the replay. This gives Sligo the unique position of having qualified for an All-Ireland Senior Football Championship final and a National Football League final, without ever having contested either.

In 1954, Sligo reached the Connacht SFC final against Galway, only for an equalising goal in the final minute to be disallowed. In 1962, Sligo reached the Connacht SFC final against Roscommon, and led for much of the match only to be blighted by a sudden string of injuries, miss a 50 while two points ahead in the final minute, and then gift soon-to-be All-Ireland SFC finalists Roscommon a goal in what is regarded as "one of the great football tragedies in Connacht". In 1965, Sligo reached the Connacht SFC final against Galway and gained a seven-point lead, only for one of its players to be "mysteriously sent to the full-forward spot", causing "the entire team [to lose] momentum" and the match.

The county Vocational Schools team reached two All-Ireland finals in 1962 and 1963, losing both to Dublin City.

In 1975, Sligo won the Connacht SFC for the first time since 1928.

Since the 2001 introduction to the All-Ireland SFC of a qualifier system for teams eliminated from its provincial championship, Sligo, despite historically having a poor record, has enjoyed some modest, though noteworthy, success. The new format together with a prolonged period of competing in Division 1 of the National Football League helped bring about an upward turn in the county's fortunes. In 2002, having narrowly lost the Connacht SFC final to Galway (the defending All-Ireland SFC champions), Sligo went on to defeat Tyrone at Croke Park, turning over a seven-point deficit in the process. A similar comeback against the eventual All-Ireland champions Armagh two weeks later led to a replay, but Sligo's run was halted when it had claims for a penalty in injury time of the second game turned down.

On 8 July 2007, Sligo claimed the Connacht SFC for the first time since 1975 with a one-point victory over Galway. Tommy Jordan, who had led Crossmolina Deel Rovers to the 2001 All-Ireland Senior Club Football Championship, took over as manager. The following year the county was trashed by Mayo while trying to retain its Connacht title and ended up in the Tommy Murphy Cup, after a league campaign that had brought relegation to Division 4. Because Sligo had been relegated, the GAA forced the reigning Connacht champions to participate in the Tommy Murphy Cup instead of the All-Ireland SFC qualifiers when it had exited the provincial championship; the county's exit to London in that competition after many players (including the county's most prominent, Eamonn O'Hara) declined to participate, was swiftly followed by Jordan's resignation. O'Hara said he was embarrassed by the team's rapid decline into mediocrity. On 27 June 2010, Sligo hosted Galway and led 1–8 to 0–2 at halftime but were shocked by an undeserved draw, ending 1–10 each. The replay saw Sligo defeat the Tribesmen by a scoreline of 1–14 to 0–16 to advance to the Connacht SFC final. Once there, after all their hard work and continued misfortune, Roscommon defeated Sligo by a scoreline of 0–14 to 0–13.

Sligo football descended to a new depth on 26 May 2013 when London dumped the county out of the Connacht SFC proper, this time, in its first game. The scoreline was 1-12 to 0-14. This was London's first victory in the Connacht SFC since 1977. Lorcan Mulvey scored the vital London goal.

Sligo did not participate in the 2020 championship, granting Galway a direct route to the 2020 Connacht final due to the impact of the COVID-19 pandemic on Gaelic games. Paul Taylor walked away as manager days after the county withdrew from the 2020 Connacht SFC (and 2020 All-Ireland SFC) due to its inability to field a team. Tony McEntee was announced as Taylor's successor. McEntee had been a runner-up for the Antrim vacancy, which he lost to Enda McGinley.

In 2021, Sligo suffered a one-sided home defeat to Mayo but in 2022 it was Sligo's turn to play New York, a fixture that returned after the COVID-19 pandemic. 

Sligo participated in the inaugural Tailteann Cup in 2022. The team defeated London in Round 1 on a scoreline of Sligo 3–15, London 2–16 (after extra-time). Sligo advanced to a quarter-final (Northern Section) game at Avantcard Páirc Seán Mac Diarmada against local rival Leitrim. The final scoreline was Leitrim 2–16, Sligo 1–19 (after extra-time), with Sligo winning the game on penalties. The team then met Cavan in the semi-final at Croke Park. Cavan defeated Sligo by a scoreline of 0–20 to 1–14.

In 2023, Sligo are scheduled to host London in the Connacht SFC quarter-final.

Current panel

INJ Player has had an injury which has affected recent involvement with the county team.
RET Player has since retired from the county team.
WD Player has since withdrawn from the county team due to a non-injury issue.

Current management team
As of April 2022:
Confirmed again in July 2022:
Manager: Tony McEntee
Assistant manager: Joe Keane
Selector: Noel McGuire, Paul Durcan (also goalkeeping coach)
Strength and conditioning coach: Seán Boyle
Performance and nutrition analyst: Brendan Egan
Athletic therapist: Kelly Anne Henry and Alan Dunne
Doctor: Dr Elaine Kenny
Forwards coach: Colm McFadden, announced November 2022 to join in January 2023

Managerial history

Players

Notable players

Neil Ewing, who gave away the free that cost the team the 2010 Connacht Senior Football Championship, after making his debut in 2008.

Records
Mickey Kearins was top scorer in National Football League history for many decades until May 2021, when David Tubridy took the record from him.

All Stars
Sligo has four All Stars, as of 2010. Each All Star was won by a different player, each representing a different club.

1971: Mickey Kearns (St Pat's)
1974: Barnes Murphy (St Mary's)
2002: Eamonn O'Hara (Toourlestrane)
2010: Charlie Harrison (St John's)

Honours

National
Tommy Murphy Cup
 Runners-up (1): 2004
 
All-Ireland Junior Football Championship
 Winners (2): 1935, 2010
All-Ireland Minor Football Championship
 Runners-up (1): 1968

Provincial
Connacht Senior Football Championship
 Winners (3): 1928, 1975, 2007
 Runners-up (15): 1920, 1922, 1930, 1932, 1947, 1954, 1956, 1965, 1971, 1981, 1997, 2002, 2010, 2012, 2015
Connacht FBD League
 Winners (1): 2004
Connacht Junior Football Championship
 Winners (11): 1926, 1928, 1935, 1956, 1973, 1998, 2005, 2010, 2011, 2013, 2014
Connacht Under-20 Football Championship
 Winners (1): 2022
Connacht Minor Football Championship
 Winners (3): 1949, 1968, 2021

References

External links
 History of Galway v Sligo

 
County football teams